Courier Forschungsinstitut Senckenberg (Senckenberg Research Institute Courier) was a multilingual (German and English) scientific journal focusing on geology and paleontology. The Senckenberg Nature Research Society published 260 volumes from 1973 to 2008.

References

External links

Defunct journals
Publications established in 1973
Publications disestablished in 2008
Multilingual journals
Biweekly journals
Geology journals
Paleontology journals
E. Schweizerbart academic journals